A stove or range is a device that burns fuel or uses electricity to generate heat inside or on top of the apparatus, to be used for general warming or cooking. It has evolved highly over time, with cast-iron and induction versions being developed. Stoves can be powered with many fuels, such as electricity, gasoline, wood, and coal.

Due to concerns about air pollution, efforts have been made to improve stove design. Pellet stoves are a type of clean-burning stove. Air-tight stoves are another type that burn the wood more completely and therefore, reduce the amount of the combustion by-products. Another method of reducing air pollution is through the addition of a device to clean the exhaust gas, for example, a filter or afterburner.

Research and development on safer and less emission releasing stoves is continuously evolving.

Etymology 
 The term "stove" is derived from the Old English word stofa, indicating any individual enclosed space or room; "stove" may sometimes still be used in this sense. Until well into the 19th century, "stove" was defined as a single heated room.

History

Versions prior 
 
Cooking was performed over an open fire since nearly two million years ago. It is uncertain how fires were started at these times; some hypotheses include the removal of burning branches from wildfires, spark generation through hitting rocks, or accidental lighting through the chipping of stone tools. During the Paleolithic era, approximately 200,000 to 40,000 years ago, primitive hearths were constructed, with stones arranged in a circle shape. Human homes centered around these hearths for warmth and food. Open fires were quite effective; most fires are 30% efficient on average, and heat is distributed positively, with no heat being lost into the body of a stove. An estimated three million people still cook their food today over open fires.

Pottery and other cooking vessels were later placed on open fire; eventually, setting the vessel on a support, such as a base of three stones, resulted in a stove. The three-stone stove is still widely used around the world. In some areas it developed into a U-shaped dried mud or brick enclosure with the opening in the front for fuel and air, sometimes with a second smaller hole at the rear.

Early designs 

The earliest recorded stove was created in Alsace, France in 1490. It was entirely made out of brick and tile, including the flue pipe. In similar times, the Ancient Egyptian, Jewish and Roman people used stone and brick ovens, fueled with wood, in order to make bread and other culinary staples. These designs did not differ extremely from modern-day pizza ovens. Later Scandinavian stoves featured a long, hollow iron chimney with iron baffles constructed to extend the passage of the leaving gases and extract maximum heat. Russian versions are still frequently used today in northern nations, as they hold six thick-walled stone flues. This design is frequently positioned at the intersection of internal partition walls, with a piece of the stove and flue inside each of four rooms; a fire is kept until the stove and flues are hot, at which point the fire is extinguished and the flues are closed, storing the heat. During Colonial America, beehive-shaped brick ovens were used to bake cakes and other pastries. Temperature control was closely managed by burning the appropriate quantity of wood to ash and then testing by inserting hands inside, adding additional wood, or opening the door to allow cooling.

Cast-iron 

In 1642, at Lynn, Massachusetts, the first cast-iron stove was constructed. This stove was little more than a cast-iron box with no grates. In 1735, the Castrol stove, or "stew stove", was developed by French designer Francois Cuvilliés. It was the earliest recorded wood-burning stove. Benjamin Franklin designed the "Pennsylvania fireplace" in 1740, which incorporated the fundamental concepts of the heating stove. The Franklin stove used a grate to burn wood and had sliding doors to control the draught, or flow of air, through it. Because of its compact size, the stove could be housed in a large fireplace or used free-standing in the middle of a room by connecting it to a chimney. Developed amid a wood shortage, it required one-quarter the quantity of fuel as a regular fireplace and could raise the room temperature more quickly. Throughout North America, the Franklin stove enjoyed widespread adoption, warming farmhouses, city residences, and frontier huts.

In 1795, Count Rumford created a particularly popular version, featuring a single fire source, but allowing for the temperature to be adjusted independently for numerous pots at once, all while heating the space. Its main disadvantage was that it was too large for most residential kitchens. Isaac Orr of Philadelphia, Pennsylvania, created the first circular cast-iron stoves with grates for cooking meals on them roughly five years later. The potbellied stove traces its origins to the early 1800s, inspired by the Franklin stove developed twenty years prior. Jordan A. Mott designed the base-burning stove for burning anthracite coal in 1833. In 1834, Philo Stewart created the Oberlin Stove, a small wood-burning cast-iron stove. It was a compact metal kitchen stove that was far more efficient than cooking in a fireplace due to its improved heating capacity and allowance for record cooking durations. It was a major commercial success because it could be formed into desired shapes and forms and could survive temperature fluctuations from hot to cold readily. These iron stoves evolved into specialized cooking machines with chimney flue pipes, oven openings, and water heating systems.

Usage of gas 
The earliest reported use of gas for cooking, according to the Gas Museum in Leicester, England, was by a Moravian called Zachaus Winzler in 1802. The switch to gas was prompted by concerns about air pollution, deforestation and climate change, causing the general public to reconsider the usage of coal and wood stoves. The first commercially-produced gas stove, invented by Englishman James Sharp, did not enter the market for another three decades. By the end of the century, the stoves became popular because they were easier to control and required less maintenance than wood or coal stoves.

Electric stoves 

Electric stoves became popular not long after the advent of home electricity. One early model was created by Thomas Ahearn, the owner of a Canadian electric company, whose marketing included a demonstration meal prepared entirely with electricity at Ottawa's Windsor Hotel in 1892.

As central heating became the standard in the developed world, cooking transitioned to the primary function of stoves in the twentieth century. Iron cooking stoves that used wood, charcoal, or coal tended to radiate much heat, which made the kitchen unbearably hot in the summer. They were superseded in the twentieth century by steel ranges or ovens fueled by natural gas or electricity.

Induction 

The first patents for induction stoves date from the early 1900s. Demonstration stoves were shown by the Frigidaire division of General Motors in the mid-1950s on a touring GM showcase in North America. The induction cooker was shown heating a pot of water with a newspaper placed between the stove and the pot, to demonstrate the convenience and safety. This unit, however, was never put into production.

Modern implementation in the USA dates from the early 1970s, with work done at the Research & Development Center of Westinghouse Electric Corporation at Churchill Borough, near Pittsburgh. That work was first put on public display at the 1971 National Association of Home Builders convention in Houston, Texas, as part of the Westinghouse Consumer Products Division display. The stand-alone single-burner range was named the Cool Top Induction Range. It used paralleled Delco Electronics transistors developed for automotive electronic ignition systems to drive the 25 kHz current.

Westinghouse decided to make a few hundred production units to develop the market. Those were named Cool Top 2 (CT2) Induction ranges. The development work was done at the same R&D location by a team led by Bill Moreland and Terry Malarkey. The ranges were priced at $1,500 ($8,260 in 2017 dollars), including a set of high quality cookware made of Quadraply, a new laminate of stainless steel, carbon steel, aluminum and another layer of stainless steel (outside to inside).

Production took place in 1973 through to 1975 and stopped, coincidentally, with the sale of Westinghouse Consumer Products Division to White Consolidated Industries Inc. Modern-day induction stoves are sold by many manufacturers, including General Electric, LG Corporation, Whirlpool Corporation, IKEA, and Samsung.

Types

Purpose

Cooking 

A kitchen stove, cooker, or cookstove is a kitchen appliance designed for the purpose of cooking food. Kitchen stoves rely on the application of direct heat for the cooking process and may also contain an oven underneath or to the side that is used for baking. Traditionally these have been fueled by wood; the earliest known example of such was the Castrol stove. More modern versions such as the popular Rayburn range offer a choice between using wood or gas.

Heating 
Stoves are also used for heating purposes. Benjamin Franklin's invention in 1740 popularized the widespread usage of modern heating stoves and fireplaces. Today, wood stoves are commonly used for warming homes, and are credited for their cost-effectiveness compared to coal and gas, and connection to the practices of human ancestors.

Fuel

Wood-burning 

A wood-burning stove (or wood burner or log burner in the UK) is a heating or cooking appliance capable of burning wood fuel and wood-derived biomass fuel, such as sawdust bricks. Generally the appliance consists of a solid metal (usually cast iron or steel) closed firebox, often lined by fire brick, and one or more air controls (which can be manually or automatically operated depending upon the stove). The first wood-burning stove was patented in Strasbourg in 1557, two centuries before the Industrial Revolution, which would make iron an inexpensive and common material, so such stoves were high end consumer items and only gradually spread in use. Wood-burning stoves are still commonly used today in less-developed countries.

Coal-burning 
The most common stove for heating in the industrial world for almost a century and a half was the coal stove that burned coal. Coal stoves came in all sizes and shapes and different operating principles. Coal burns at a much higher temperature than wood, and coal stoves must be constructed to resist the high heat levels. A coal stove can burn either wood or coal, but a wood stove might not burn coal unless a grate is supplied. The grate may be removable or an "extra".

This is because coal stoves are fitted with a grate so allowing part of the combustion air to be admitted below the fire. The proportion of air admitted above/below the fire depends on the type of coal. Brown coal and lignites evolve more combustible gases than say anthracite and so need more air above the fire. The ratio of air above/below the fire must be carefully adjusted to enable complete combustion.

Coal, particularly anthracite coal, became a popular option during the 1800s in the United States because it burned at a high heat while also producing little soot. By 1860, as much as 90% of United States homes used anthracite coal as a solution for the fuel crisis that the United States faced. One major issue with the use of coal burning stoves in the 1800s was limitations of storing the material over time. A division between the wealthy and poor in using coal stoves was that many poor families could not afford to store the volumes of coal needed to heat homes for long periods of time. Therefore, while wealthy families could store large amounts of coal in cellars, poorer families often had to purchase coal in smaller quantities. Therefore, difficulties surrounding the storage of coal helped push the use and development of gas stoves.

Gas 
Gas stoves were first introduced by Moravian Zachaus Winzler in 1802. Today, according to the US Energy Information Administration, 35% of American households use gas stoves. They are chosen as they offer better temperature control, durability, low cost, and speed of heating. Gas-powered stoves are criticized for environmental concerns with methane leaks and the usage of natural gas, the danger of carbon monoxide release, and difficulty in cleaning.

Electricity 

Induction stoves were first patented in the early 1900s. These stoves are praised for their cost-effectiveness, ease of cleaning, options to control low heat, and stable base for many types and sizes of pots and other cooking tools. Critics note that abrasive cleaners can damage induction stoves, that gas has more traditional culinary associations, and that induction stoves are unable to operate during power outages.

Efficiency
Compared to simple open fires, enclosed stoves can offer greater efficiency and control.

By enclosing the fire in a chamber and connecting it to a chimney, draft (draught) is generated pulling fresh air through the burning fuel. This causes the temperature of combustion to rise to a point where efficient combustion is achieved, the enclosure allows the ingress of air to be regulated and losses by convection are almost eliminated. It also becomes possible, with ingenious design, to direct the flow of burned gasses inside the stove such that smoke particles are heated and destroyed.

Enclosing a fire also prevents air from being sucked from the room into the chimney. This can represent a significant loss of heat as an open fireplace can pull away many cubic meters of heated air per hour. Efficiency is generally regarded as the maximum heat output of a stove or fire, and is usually referred to by manufacturers as the difference between heat to the room and heat lost up the chimney.

An early improvement was the fire chamber: the fire was enclosed on three sides by masonry walls and covered by an iron plate. Only in 1735 did the first design that completely enclosed the fire appear: the Castrol stove of the French architect François de Cuvilliés was a masonry construction with several fireholes covered by perforated iron plates. It is also known as a stew stove. Near the end of the 18th century, the design was refined by hanging the pots in holes through the top iron plate, thus improving heat efficiency even more.

In 1743, Benjamin Franklin invented an all-metal fireplace with an attempt to improve the efficiency. It was still an open-faced fireplace, but improved on efficiency compared to old-fashioned fireplaces.

Some stoves use a catalytic converter, which causes combustion of the gas and smoke particles not previously burned. Other models use a design that includes firebox insulation, a large baffle to produce a longer, hotter gas flow path. Modern enclosed stoves are often built with a window to let out some light and to enable the user to view progress of the fire.

While enclosed stoves are typically more efficient and controllable than open fires, there are exceptions. The type of water-heating "back boiler" open fires commonly used in Ireland, for instance, can achieve more than 80% absolute efficiency.

Material

Masonry heaters were developed to control air flow in stoves. A masonry heater is designed to allow complete combustion by burning fuels at full-temperature with no restriction of air inflow. Due to its large thermal mass the captured heat is radiated over long periods of time without the need of constant firing, and the surface temperature is generally not dangerous to touch.

Metal stoves came into use in the 18th century. An early and famous example of a metal stove is the Franklin stove, said to have been invented by Benjamin Franklin in 1742. It had a labyrinthine path for hot exhaust gases to escape, thus allowing heat to enter the room instead of going up the chimney. The Franklin stove, however, was designed for heating, not for cooking. Benjamin Thompson at the turn to the 19th century was among the first to present a working metal kitchen stove. His Rumford fireplace used one fire to heat several pots that were also hung into holes so that they could be heated from the sides, too. It was even possible to regulate the heat individually for each hole. His stove was designed for large canteen or castle kitchens, though. It would take another 30 years until the technology had been refined and the size of the iron stove been reduced enough for domestic use. Philo Stewart's Oberlin stove was a much more compact, wood-burning cast-iron stove, patented in the United States in 1834. It became a huge commercial success with some 90,000 units sold in the next 30 years. In Europe, similar designs also appeared in the 1830s. In the following years, these iron stoves evolved into specialised cooking appliances with flue pipes connected to the chimney, oven holes, and installations for heating water. The originally open holes into which the pots were hung were now covered with concentric iron rings on which the pots were placed. Depending on the size of the pot or the heat needed, one could remove the inner rings.

Modern designs
As concerns about air pollution, deforestation, and climate change have increased, new efforts have been made to improve stove design. The largest strides have been made in innovations for biomass-burning stoves, such as the wood-burning stoves used in many of the world's most populous countries. These new designs address the fundamental problem that wood and other biomass fires inefficiently consume large amounts of fuel to produce relatively small amounts of heat, while producing fumes that cause significant indoor and environmental pollutants. The World Health Organization has documented the significant number of deaths caused by smoke from home fires. Increases in efficiency allow users of stoves to spend less time gathering wood or other fuels, suffer less emphysema and other lung diseases prevalent in smoke-filled homes, while reducing deforestation and air pollution.

Corn and pellet stoves and furnaces are a type of biofuel stove. The shelled dry kernel of corn, also called a corn pellet, creates as much heat as a wood pellet, but generates more ash. "Corn pellet stoves and wood pellet stoves look the same from the outside. Since they are highly efficient, they don't need a chimney; instead, they can be vented outdoors by a four-inch (102 mm) pipe through an outside wall and so can be located in any room in the home."

A pellet stove is a type of clean-burning stove that uses small, biological fuel pellets which are renewable and very clean-burning. Home heating using a pellet stove is an alternative currently used throughout the world, with rapid growth in Europe. The pellets are made of renewable material — typically wood sawdust or off-cuts. There are more than half a million homes in North America using pellet stoves for heat, and probably a similar number in Europe. The pellet stove typically uses a feed screw to transfer pellets from a storage hopper to a combustion chamber. Air is provided for the combustion by an electric blower. The ignition is automatic, using a stream of air heated by an electrical element. The rotation speed of the feeder and the fan speeds can be varied to modulate the heat output.

Other efficient stoves are based on Top Lit updraft (T-LUD) or wood gas or smoke burner stove, a principle applied and made popular by Dr. Thomas Reed, which use small pieces of sticks, chips of wood or shavings, leaves, etc., as fuel. The efficiency is very high — up to 50 percent — as compared to traditional stoves that are 5 to 15 percent efficient on average.

Stoves fueled by alcohol, such as ethanol, offer another modern, clean-burning stove option. Ethanol-fueled stoves have been made popular through the work of Project Gaia in Africa, Latin America and the Caribbean.

Airtightness

An air-tight stove is a wood-burning stove designed to burn solid fuel, traditionally wood, in a controlled fashion so as to provide for efficient and controlled fuel use, and the benefits of stable heating or cooking temperatures. They are made of sheet metal, consisting of a drum-like combustion chamber with airflow openings that can be open and shut, and a chimney of a metre or more length.

These stoves are used most often to heat buildings in winter. Wood or other fuel is put into the stove, lit, and then air flow is regulated to control the burn. The intake airflow is either at the level where fuel is added, or below it. The exhaust (smoke) from the stove is usually several metres above the combustion chamber.

Most modern air-tight stoves feature a damper at the stove's outlet that can be closed to force the exhaust through an after burner at the top of the stove, a heated chamber in which the combustion process continues. Some air-tight stoves feature a catalytic converter, a platinum grid placed at the stove outlet to burn remaining fuel that has not been combusted, as gases burn at a much lower temperature in the presence of platinum.

Using an air-tight stove initially requires leaving the damper and air vents open until a bed of coals has been formed. After that, the damper is closed and the air vent regulated to slow down the burning of the wood. A properly loaded and controlled air-tight stove will burn safely without further attention for eight hours, or longer.

These features provide a more complete combustion of wood and elimination of polluting combustion products. It also provides for regulation of the intensity of fire by limiting air flow, and for the fire to create a strong draught or draw up the chimney. This results in highly efficient fuel usage.

Air-tight stoves are a more sophisticated version of traditional wood-burning stoves.

Emission regulation

Many countries legislate to control emissions.
Since 2015, the United States Environmental Protection Agency (EPA) Phase III Woodstove Regulations in the United States require that all wood stoves being manufactured limit particulate emission to 4.5 grams per hour for stoves with after burners or 2.5 grams per hour for stoves with catalytic converters.

The burn temperature in modern stoves can increase to the point where secondary and complete combustion of the fuel takes place. A properly fired masonry heater has little or no particulate pollution in the exhaust and does not contribute to the buildup of creosote in the heater flues or the chimney. Some stoves achieve as little as 1 to 4 grams per hour. This is roughly 10% as much smoke than older stoves, and equates to nearly zero visible smoke from the chimney. This is largely achieved through causing the maximum amount of material to combust, which results in a net efficiency of 60 to 70%, as contrasted to less than 30% for an open fireplace. Net efficiency is defined as the amount of heat energy transferred to the room compared to the amount contained in the wood, minus any amount central heating must work to compensate for airflow problems.

SB 1256, a bill that would ban the sale of disposable, single-use propane cylinders in California, is set to be presented for approval to Governor Gavin Newsom. If signed into law, the ban would take effect in January 2023 and would be the first of its kind in the United States. SB 1256 aims to phase out the cylinders completely by 2028; the state Assembly and Senate both approved the legislation. Propane stoves are widely used by campers for cooking, lighting, and heating, and the spent gas canisters often pile up on the ground near dumpsters at campgrounds. The bill is sponsored by the California Product Stewardship Council, a nonprofit local government coalition, in an effort to reduce waste and cut down on the pile-ups of canisters. Worthington Industries, a manufacturer of propane cylinders, has objected to the bill on the grounds that it would be disruptive to campers and that it would not improve the recycling rate of propane cylinders. The company has also argued that refillable cylinders cost three times as much as single-use cylinders.

Research and development
The search for safer, cleaner stoves remains to many an important if low-profile area of modern technology. Cook stoves in common use around the world, particularly in Third World countries, are considered fire hazards and worse: according to the World Health Organization, a million and a half people die each year from indoor smoke inhalation caused by faulty stoves. An engineer's "Stove Camp" has been hosted annually since 1999 by Aprovecho Research Center (Oregon, US) with the intent of designing a cheap, efficient, and healthy cook stove for use around the world. Other engineering societies (see Envirofit International, Colorado, US) and philanthropic groups (see the Bill & Melinda Gates Foundation, California) continue to research and promote improved cook stove designs. A focus on research and development on improved heating stoves is ongoing and was on display at the 2013 Wood Stove Decathlon in Washington, D.C.

See also

 Foot stove
 List of cooking appliances
 List of stoves
 Multi-fuel stove
 Pellet baskets
 Portable stove

References

Further reading
 Harris, Howell J., "Inventing the U.S. Stove Industry, c. 1815–1875: Making and Selling the First Universal Consumer Durable," Business History Review, 82 (Winter 2008), 701–33
 Harris, Howell, "Coping with Competition: Cooperation and Collusion in the U.S. Stove Industry, c. 1870–1930", Business History Review, 86 (Winter 2012), 657–692.
 Roth C., "Micro Gasification: Cooking with gas from biomass" 1st edition, released January 2011 Published by GIZ HERA – Poverty-oriented Basic Energy Service

External links

 Woodheat.org information on woodstoves
 Thomas "Electricity" Ahearn, Canada’s Thomas Edison
 Early Chinese stoves
 Early Japanese stoves

Cooking appliances
Heating, ventilation, and air conditioning
Stoves